A list of notable buildings and structures in Eritrea: